Nkpa is a small town in Bende Local Government Area of Abia state in Nigeria. It became an autonomous community in 1983. It is made up of several small villages.

Geography
The town is accessible through Uzuakoli and Umuahia. It is connected to Lohum and Lodu by a ring road, but as of 2016 roads in the area are in poor condition, with some upgrades planned.

Economy
Nkpa's economy is mainly agriculture based. The area has many oil palm plantations and root crops such as cassava are commonly grown. Nkpa has a micro finance bank to support her thriving economy.

References

Populated places in Abia State